The Extra Day is a 1956 British comedy-drama film directed by William Fairchild and starring Richard Basehart, Simone Simon and George Baker.

Plot
After the final scene of a film is lost by the driver taking it to the printing lab, the cast and extras have to be rounded up for it to be re-shot. This proves to be quite an endeavour. The director, German exile Kurt Vorn sends several people out to gather the required actors, who are mainly in theatres.

Meanwhile Ronnie, a new Sinatra-style crooner sings to crowds of adoring girls while his girlfriend Toni struggles to cope with this, until he announces to his adoring fans that he is going to marry her. The public proposal pushes Joe into also proposing which is met with a slap on the face.

However, once all are assembled, the driver Harry returns with a battered film canister, saying the reshoot is not needed after all.

Cast

References

External links
 

1956 films
1956 comedy films
British comedy films
1950s English-language films
Films directed by William Fairchild
1950s British films